Chips Mackinolty (born 12 March 1954) is an Australian artist. He was involved in the campaigns against the war in Vietnam by producing posters, and was a key figure in the radical poster movement.

Early life
Chips Mackinolty was born on 12 March 1954 in Morwell, Victoria.

Art career
During the 1970s posters became an art form, with artists using the cheap posters as a political tool. The Earthworks Poster Collective, established in 1971, was the most active and well-known of these groups. Earthworks operated from the Sydney University Art Workshop, commonly known as the Tin Sheds.

Mackinolty was introduced to screen printing in Goulburn Street, Sydney.

In 1978 Mackinolty designed a poster to commemorate Prime Minister Robert Menzies death, to reflect a working-class view on the prime minister, and the "Pig Iron Bob" nickname that was given to him during the Dalfram dispute of 1938.

Mackinolty used sharp, flat colours and increasingly professional techniques to produce posters such as "For the man who said life wasn't meant to be easy – make life impossible".  The poster is a multi-imaged send-up of former Australian Prime Minister Malcolm Fraser.  It was posted up at night around Sydney, helping to politicise a generation.

Public service roles
With the dissolution of Earthworks Poster Collective in 1980, Mackinolty moved first to Townsville, North Queensland, as a community arts officer, and then to the Northern Territory. He worked as an art adviser to Aboriginal art centres in Katherine. (Mimi Aboriginal Arts and Crafts, 1981–1985) and Mutitjulu (Maruku Arts, 1985). From then until 1990 he worked at the Northern Land Council in Darwin as a journalist, designer and field officer. He produced a number of posters in that period under the name Jalak Graphics, although most were printed at Redback Graphics in Wollongong and Sydney. Many used Aboriginal languages in their text.

During the 1990s Mackinolty worked with others from Darwin under the banner of Green Ant Research Arts and Publishing. He also accepted assignments from the Country Liberal Party (CLP) government, including the euthanasia education program. He also acted as a go-between, liaising between the CLP government and the Jawoyn traditional owners of Katherine.

Mackinolty was employed as an advisor to the Northern Territory Labor government from 2002 to 2009, under various ministers, then quit to work for the Aboriginal Medical Services Alliance Northern Territory (AMSANT) as a policy worker, a position he held until 2013, when he left for an extended period in Europe and the Middle East.

Journalist
As well as graphic design, Mackinolty worked as a correspondent for newspapers, including the Sydney Morning Herald, The Age, The Australian and The Bulletin. He has been an occasional correspondent for Crikey, particularly its arts section, and has also contributed articles to The Monthly.

Exhibitions and awards
Work in the 1990s included a controversial exhibition of posters with colleague Therese Ritchie If you see this exhibition you'll know we have been murdered which was attacked by the then CLP government (1998).  Along with Ritchie, in 2000 he was a joint winner with Bede Tungatalum, of the Fremantle Print Award.

In 2010, again with Therese Ritchie, he held a retrospective at Charles Darwin University, Not Dead Yet. In the same year he won the 4th Togart Award worth $15,000, for Contemporary Visual Art. He continues to exhibit art in the Northern Territory, interstate and internationally. His 2016 exhibition The Wealth of the Land was launched in Palermo, Sicily.

Collections
His work is held in many major galleries in Australia, including the National Gallery of Australia; National Museum of Australia; Artbank; Art Gallery of NSW; National Gallery of Victoria; Museum and Art Gallery of the Northern Territory; Charles Darwin University; Australian War Memorial;  Art Gallery of South Australia; the National Library of Australia; Australian Centre for the Moving Image; and many others. His work can also be found in the National Library of New Zealand, Médiathèque de silos in Chaumont, France; the Museum of Modern Art in New York, and in private collections abroad.

References

External links

Chips Mackinolty at Design & Art Australia Online
Chips Mackinolty at the MCA

1954 births
Living people
Australian poster artists
People from Darwin, Northern Territory
People from Morwell, Victoria
Australian printmakers